George Macaulay Irwin (May 2, 1921 – November 24, 2020) was an American expert in the arts and a businessman, editor, musician and conductor. Irwin is known for his work with arts organizations on the local, state, and national levels, as well as his efforts in preserving historic architecture. He was also the founder of America's first arts council, the Quincy Society of Fine Arts, the founder and first chairman of the Illinois Arts Council, founder and first president of the Americans for the Arts (formerly American Council for the Arts), and worked as a consultant on the committee that established the National Endowment for the Arts.

Early life
Irwin was born and raised in Quincy, Illinois and graduated from Quincy Public Schools in 1939.

Irwin then attended the University of Michigan and graduated in 1943.

Career
Upon college graduation, Irwin moved back to Quincy, Illinois and worked at Irwin Paper Company from 1943 to 1969. He was the Personnel Director of the company from 1950 to 1969. In 1947, Irwin became the editor of Adventure in Enterprise, a biography of Leaton Irwin, the man who founded Irwin Paper Co. in 1887. Irwin served as a chairman on the board of directors at Irwin Paper Company, the Peoria Paper House, Inc. and the Decatur Paper House Inc. from 1961 to 1969.

From 1961 to 1971, Irwin served as a chairman on the board of directors for Quincy Compressor Company, a division of Colt Industries.

Irwin was the collector of 20th century art by American artists, and starting in 1950, he commissioned works from American composers, painters, and sculptors for his collection.

Irwin is credited with placing several Quincy landmarks on the National Register of Historic Places, some of which he personally saved from planned destruction and then restored.

Personal life

He resided in his hometown of Quincy, Illinois until his death at Blessing Hospital on November 24, 2020. His obituary was published on November 24, 2020 by the Quincy Herald-Whig.

Local activities

Irwin was a former scoutmaster for Troop 8, former board member and president of Woodland Home, and a former board member, president, and chairman of the United Fund. He was also a former board member for the following organizations: Quincy Civic Music Association, Quincy Community Little Theatre, Blessing Hospital, Quincy Area Project, and the Congregational Church.

State activities

National activities

Architectural work
George M. Irwin was active in Architecture and Historic Preservation projects in Quincy, Illinois for over a half-century.

Buildings restored by Irwin
Charles Henry Bull House (1856) (Spent 35 years restoring the two acres of house and grounds)
Loan and Trust Company (Patton & Fisher, Architects, 1892)
Ernest Wood Office and Studio (Ernest Wood, architect, 1912)
Free Public Library (Patton & Fisher, 1888) (Lead the public effort to defeat a bond issue and helped the library find another downtown location)
William S. Warfield House (Joseph Lyman Silsbee, 1886) (Acquired this property through the Quincy Foundation, it rested on a nationally important intersection, supervised its extensive restoration, prevented it from being cut up into modest duplex houses)

Buildings Irwin assisted with the restoration of
Richard Newcomb House (Harvey Chatten 1890)
Dr. Richard Eells House (Had a major effect on the acquisition and restoration of this nationally recognized Underground Railroad site in Quincy)

Surveys, studies, tours, and literature organized by Irwin
1976: Organized Quincy's first Historic House Tour which resulted in the organization of the private group Quincy Preserves the next year (Through the Quincy Society of Fine Arts)
1996: Developed the plan and led the effort to raise $130,000 to produce Historic Quincy Architecture, a 128-page book of color photographs of Quincy's most important houses and commercial and public buildings from the 1830s to the 1930s. Sale of the 6,500 has benefited nine Quincy cultural groups (Suggested by Houston architectural photographer Richard Payne)

Awards and honors
1963 Solano Medal of Honor (Quincy College)
1973 Honorary Doctor of Fine Arts (Culver-Stockton College, Canton, MO)
1978 Governor's Arts Award (Illinois Arts Council)
1978 Commendation for 30 years of community service, 80th General Assembly Resolution No.1079 (State of Illinois House of Representatives)
1981 Distinguished Service Award (Southern Illinois University, Edwardsville)
1981 First City of Quincy Arts Award (Quincy Society of Fine Arts)
1983 Preservation Honor Award (National Trust for Historic Preservation)
1990 Honorary Doctor of Humane Letters (Western Illinois University, Macomb)
1990 Lifetime Achievement Award (Illinois Arts Alliance Foundation, Chicago)
1996 Distinguished Service Award for Support of the Arts, presented at July conference in Puerto Rico (National Governors Association)
1999 Richard Driehaus Foundation Award for lifetime work in historic preservation (Landmarks Preservation Council of Illinois)
1999 Studs Terkel Award for Lifetime Service to the Arts and Humanities (Illinois Humanities Council)
 Award for organizing the Illinois Arts Council (1965), and serving as First chairman through 1971 (Illinois Arts Council)
2000 Governor's Proclamation: “George M. Irwin Day in Illinois” April 28, 2000 (State of Illinois) 
2000 Mayor’s Proclamation: “George M. Irwin Day in Quincy” April 28, 2000 (City of Quincy)
2000 Honorary Doctor of Humane Letters (Quincy University)
2003 BRAVO Award (Muddy River Opera Company, Quincy)
2006 Historic Quincy Business District Award for Excellence in Downtown Revitalization, Preservation Pioneer Award
2007 Recognition as Founder and First President at 60th Anniversary Reception in November (Quincy Society of Fine Arts)
2008 Dedication of April 2008 concert in 60th anniversary Season to Founder and First Conductor (Quincy Symphony Orchestra)
2008 Selina Roberts Ottum Award for 60 years of service to the Arts and Community Development in Philadelphia during June 2008 (Americans for the Arts, co-sponsored by the National Endowment for the Arts)
2014 Dedication of original composition by Thom Ritter George "Song of the Harp" on April 12, 2014 (Quincy Symphony Orchestra)

References 

1921 births
2020 deaths
20th-century American artists
21st-century American artists
People from Quincy, Illinois